Vasefjan (also Romanized as Vāşefjān, Vāşfejān, and Vāşf Jān) is a village in Karasht Rural District, in the Bumehen District of Pardis County, Tehran Province, Iran. At the 2006 census, its population was 96, in 28 families.

References 

Populated places in Pardis County